Denike is a surname. Notable people with the surname include:

Jen DeNike, American contemporary artist
John Robert Denike (1903–1985), Canadian politician in Saskatchewan

See also
Denike (Sri Lanka)
Deniker
Denise (given name)